Shabnam Parvin (born 1966) is a Bangladeshi actress, director, and producer.

Career
Shabnam Parvin started her acting career in 1982, performing on stage in a play entitled Kumar Khalir Char, 
against the wishes of her parents.
Later she appeared in television and radio plays. Parvin performed in a TV play Duti Gaan-Er Ekti Shur, aired in 1982 and produced by Alauddin Ahemed. In 1985 she made her film debut in Agun Pani, directed by K. M. Ayub.

As a producer
Shabnam Parvin has also produced several films, with her production house Sabnam Films. Her first production was Mrittundondo, followed by Papi Shatru, Sotter Songram, Voyungkor Nari, Durdhirso Pamela and Kukkhato Jorina. She has also produced some drama for television.

TV programmes and shows
Sabnam Parvin is now more famous for Bangladesh Television (BTV) magazine programme Ittadi as a Nani-Nati. She stars in this show as a comic Grandmother (Nani) with her Grandson (Nati). She has also appeared in shows such as Cooking, Rannga Pori Amar Ami and others.

Personal and family life
Sabnam Parvin lives in Uttara Thana. In 2008, while the house was under construction, a gang of robbers forced their way in, stole jewellery and cash worth 800,000 taka, and tied up the family, leading to the death of Shabnam's father.

Filmography

TV drama and serials

References
 http://www.bbarta24.net/entertainment/28836

Further reading

External links
 

1966 births
Living people
Bangladeshi film actresses
Bangladeshi film producers
Bangladeshi television directors
Bangladeshi women film producers
Women television directors